Saca Chispas is a populated place in Paysandú Department, Uruguay.

Populated places in the Paysandú Department